Douglass Pope Cadwallader (January 29, 1884 – February 7, 1971) was an American golfer who competed in the 1904 Summer Olympics. In 1904 he was part of the American team which won the bronze medal. He finished second in this competition. In the individual competition he finished 11th in the qualification and was eliminated in the first round of the match play.

He died in Hennepin County, Minnesota. He is buried in Lakewood Cemetery in Minneapolis, Minnesota.

References

External links
 Profile 

American male golfers
Amateur golfers
Golfers at the 1904 Summer Olympics
Medalists at the 1904 Summer Olympics
Olympic bronze medalists for the United States in golf
Golfers from Minnesota
1884 births
1971 deaths